Cury is a surname derived from the Latin word curia. It may refer to:

Augusto Cury (born 1958), Brazilian physician, psychiatrist, psychotherapist and writer
 Brian Cury, founder and CEO of Earthcam
Guy Cury (1930–2018), French hurdler 
Joe Cury (1928–1977), owner of the Mandarin Super Market and a resident of Mandarin, Florida
Michel Cury Neto (born 1981), Brazilian footballer

See also
Curi (disambiguation)
Curie (disambiguation)
Petty Cury, a pedestrianised shopping street in central Cambridge, England
Khouri or Khoury, an alternative of Cury